Mabein is a town in northern Shan State of Myanmar, formerly Burma. It is situated on the Shweli River and connected to Momeik, and to Bhamo and Myitkyina in Kachin State by road.

Economy
Mabein is a major rice producing area in the Shweli basin. Teak extracted from forests around Mabein is classified as Medium Good.
Mabein Township is considered poppy - free by the United Nations International Drug Control Programme (UNDCP) in the Opium Survey 2002, and in the World Drug Report 2005 published by the United Nations Office on Drugs and Crime (UNODC).

Gold deposits exist in the Mabein region within the 500 km2 Shante gold belt within the Mogok metamorphics north and north-east of Mandalay. In January 2004, the military government signed a contract with two Canadian companies to prospect gold in two zones known as Set Ga Done and Nga Mu Gyi.

Security vs human rights
On 10 November 2005, seven hired cattle drovers were reported shot dead by an army patrol from a battalion based in Momeik.

Notes

External links
Satellite map GeoNames

Populated places in Shan State
Township capitals of Myanmar